Moshe Peled may refer to:

Moshe Peled (politician), Israeli politician, Knesset member between 1992 and 1999
Moshe Peled (soldier) (1926–2000), Israeli general